Aing Daing is a village island in Madaya Township in Pyin Oo Lwin District in the Mandalay Division of central Myanmar. It lies just outside the north west of Mandalay city and on the Ayeyarwady River.

References

External links
Maplandia World Gazetteer

Populated places in Pyin Oo Lwin District
Madaya Township
Islands of Myanmar
River islands of Asia